Legislative elections were held in Argentina on 1 March 1942. Voter turnout was 67%.

Results

Results by province

References

Argentina
1942 in Argentina
Elections in Argentina
Infamous Decade
March 1942 events